Micael Cabrita Silva (born 16 March 1993) is a Portuguese professional footballer who plays as a midfielder for Liga Portugal 2 club Penafiel as a midfielder.

References

External links

1993 births
People from Silves, Portugal
Living people
Portuguese footballers
Association football midfielders
Portimonense S.C. players
Zawisza Bydgoszcz players
C.F. União players
S.C. Covilhã players
S.C. Farense players
C.D. Feirense players
F.C. Penafiel players
Liga Portugal 2 players
Ekstraklasa players
I liga players
Portuguese expatriate footballers
Expatriate footballers in Poland
Portuguese expatriate sportspeople in Poland
Sportspeople from Faro District